Moral constructivism or ethical constructivism is a view both in meta-ethics and normative ethics.

Metaethical constructivism holds that correctness of moral judgments, principles and values is determined by being the result of a suitable constructivist procedure. In other words, normative values are not something discovered by the use of theoretical reason, but a construction of human practical reason.

In normative ethics, moral constructivism is the view that principles and values within a given normative domain can be justified based on the very fact that they are the result of a suitable constructivist device or procedure.

See also
 Constructivism in Practical Philosophy
 Ethical subjectivism
 Moral rationalism
 Pragmatic ethics

References

External links 

Epistemological theories
Meta-ethics
Normative ethics
Rationalism
A priori
Constructivism